Sara's Secrets was a Food Network show hosted by Sara Moulton who was the executive chef of Gourmet magazine. Sara’s Secrets aired from 2002 until 2007.
Sara's Secrets offers the viewer recipes and techniques specifically focused to fit the viewer's busy lifestyle.

From time to time, guest chefs, cookbook authors, and food specialists from around the world drop by. Invited guests give the viewer insider secrets, tips, tricks, techniques that professionals use to save time and money.

Sara Moulton shows the viewer how to make the best meals possible by keeping it simple with a limited amount of fuss, but also with good flavor.

Episode list

Season 1
HCSP03 Sara's Thanksgiving Secrets
SS1A01 Tricks for the Pastry Impaired
SS1A02 The Perfect Salad
SS1A03 Dinner Party of Miniatures
SS1A04 Dinner For Two
SS1A05 Tantalizing Tarts
SS1A06 Two Birthday Parties
SS1A07 Complete Make-Ahead Brunch
SS1A08 Trompe L'Oeil Food Gifts
SS1A09 Do You Fondue?
SS1A10 Sunday Night Supper
SS1A11 Food As Fashion
SS1A12 Low Fat Fooled Ya
SS1A13 Cinderella Dishes
SS1A14 Unexpected Guests
SS1A15 One Cake Fits All
SS1A16 A Special Occasion Dinner
SS1A17 Surprise Holiday Guests
SS1A18 Food and Wine Tasting
SS1A19 Pizza Party
SS1A20 Come For Drinks, Stay For Dinner
SS1A21 Thanksgiving Primer
SS1A22 Open House
SS1A23 Mediterranean Magic
SS1A24 Wrap Magic
SS1A25 Budget Gourmet
SS1A26 Some Assembly Required
SS1B01 Always On Hand
SS1B02 Feasts From the Fridge
SS1B03 Feasts From the Freezer
SS1B04 Double Duty
SS1B05 Breakfast for Dinner
SS1B06 Frozen Dinners
SS1B07 Sandwich Sensations
SS1B08 Soup as Supper
SS1B09 Shortcuts to Success
SS1B10 Cooking For One
SS1B11 Better Burgers
SS1B12 One Pot Meals
SS1B13 Fast and Fabulous Fish
SS1B14 Secrets to Simple Sautes
SS1B15 Slow Cooking
SS1B16 Blue Plate Specials
SS1B18 Taters, Taters, Taters
SS1B19 Getting Organized
SS1B20 Pot Pies
SS1B21 A New Way to Cook
SS1B22 Quick and Easy Sides
SS1B23 Grill Pan
SS1B24 Everyday Vegetarian
SS1B25 Easy Desserts
SS1B26 Quick Pasta Sauces
SS1B27 Rice for Supper
SS1B28 Paella Fiesta
SS1B29 The Mold Makes It
SS1B30 Main Course Salads
SS1B31 Bistro Dinner
SS1B32 Mexican Night
SS1B33 Seafood Sandwiches
SS1B34 Corn Every Way
SS1B35 Pounding Out Dinner
SS1B36 Dinner at the Beach
SS1B37 No-Fail Fish
SS1B38 Exotic Dinner
SS1B39 Five Ingredient Wonders
SS1B40 Casual Entertaining
SS1B41 One Pot Meal
SS1B42 Packed With Flavor
SS1B43 Sweet Endings
SS1B44 Mediterranean Mezze Table
SS1B45 Quick and Tasty Chicken
SS1B46 Wok this Way
SS1B47 Lemons Every Way
SS1B48 Appetizing Dinner
SS1B49 Real Simple
SS1B50 Here's the Beef
SS1B51 Lasagna Three Ways
SS1B52 Eat Your Vegetables
SS1B53 All About Cheese
SS1B54 Quick Breads
SS1B55 Celebrations
SS1B56 Quick Sauces
SS1B57 Crazy About Couscous
SS1B58 Romantic Sailboat Picnic
SS1B60 Skewer It!
SS1B61 Three Dinners in One
SS1B68 Midsummer Swedish Buffet
SS1B71 Dinner in Twenty Minutes
SS1B72 Warm Weather Soups
SS1B73 Berry Best
SS1B74 Celebrating Tomatoes
SS1B75 Terrace Lunch
SS1B79 Tempting Tarts
SS1B80 Gadgets Galore
SS1B81 Perfecting Vinaigrette
SS1B82 All Fired Up
SS1B84 Fisherman's Catch
SS1B86 Quick and Easy Pasta
SS1B87 Basics of Herbs
SS1C30 California Cooking

Season 2
SS1B17 Five Ingredient Wonders
SS1B59 Dinner en Surprise
SS1B62 Five Ingredient Wonders
SS1B63 Double Duty
SS1B64 Chicken Three Ways
SS1B65 Elegant Soiree
SS1B66 Portuguese Dinner
SS1B67 Retro Cocktail Party
SS1B69 Four Star Home Entertaining
SS1B70 Four Star Dessert Party
SS1B76 Impromptu Dinner Party
SS1B77 Feelin' Good
SS1B78 All About Cheesecakes
SS1B83 Sunday Dinner with Aunt Fannie
SS1B85 Weeknight Warriors
SS1B88 All About Lilies

Season 3
SS1C01 One Dish Wonders
SS1C02 Cold Weather Soups
SS1C03 Cooking Ahead
SS1C04 Savory Pies
SS1C05 All About Chicken
SS1C06 Holiday Cake
SS1C07 Sunday Pot Roast
SS1C08 Cooking for One
SS1C09 Cooking in a Shoebox
SS1C10 Gadgets Galore: Food Processor
SS1C11 Taqueria Night
SS1C12 All-American Breakfast
SS1C13 Five Ingredients or Less
SS1C14 Just Say Cheese
SS1C15 International Sandwiches
SS1C16 All About Peanut Butter
SS1C17 Pot Luck
SS1C18 Everyday Chinese
SS1C19 Melting Pot Meals
SS1C20 Quick and Easy Breads
SS1C21 Eating Right
SS1C22 Market Basket
SS1C23 Chef Cooks at Home
SS1C24 Chocolate Desserts
SS1C25 East Indian Dinner
SS1C26 Cooking for a Crowd
SS1C27 Dim Sum Party
SS1C28 Pacific Northwest Thanksgiving
SS1C29 Dinner With Friends
SS1C31 Halloween Party
SS1C32 Everyday Caribbean
SS1C33 Cooking With Kids
SS1C34 Hors d'oeuvre Party
SS1C35 All About Chilies
SS1C36 Simple Seafood
SS1C37 Championship Chili
SS1C38 Spectacular Serving
SS1C39 Fireside Dinner
SS1C40 French Sunday Lunch
SS1C41 One Pot Wonders: Boeuf a la Bourguignonne
SS1C42 Everyday Asian
SS1C43 Perfect Pairings
SS1C44 Entertaining On a Shoestring
SS1C45 Fiesta Latino
SS1C46 Meatless Meals
SS1C47 All About Turkey
SS1C48 Pot Luck
SS1C49 Super Sauces
SS1C50 Spring Celebration
SS1C51 Effortless Entertaining
SS1C52 Chefs Cook at Home
SS1C53 International Breakfast
SS1C54 Greek Easter
SS1C55 Spring Sides
SS1C56 Slimmed Down Classics
SS1C57 Double Duty
SS1C58 Gadgets Galore - Toaster Oven
SS1C59 Simple Sautes
SS1C60 Spectacular Serving
SS1C61 Five Ingredients or Less
SS1C62 Old Fashioned Desserts
SS1C63 All About Dried Herbs
SS1C64 Steakhouse Dinner
SS1C65 Cooking for One
SS1C66 International Noodles
SS1C67 Weekday Wraps
SS1C68 Simple Soups
SS1C69 You Can Please Everyone
SS1C70 Meal Makeovers
SS1C71 All About Avocadoes and Pineapples
SS1C72 Shortcut Suppers

Season 3
SS1D01 Poach it!
SS1D02 Heat Beater Sauces
SS1D03 Grilled Sandwiches
SS1D04 You Can Please Everyone - Vegetarian and Carnivore
SS1D05 Chefs Cook at Home
SS1D06 Burger Basics
SS1D07 Berry Best
SS1D08 Chicken Salads
SS1D09 Global Noodles
SS1D10 Farm Fresh
SS1D11 Sara's Favorite Restaurant Dishes
SS1D12 Everyday Mexican
S1D13 Gadgets Galore: Ice Cream Parlor Treats
S1D14 More Meatless Meals
S1D15 Beer Tasting
S1D16 Everyday Italian
S1D17 Sensational Sides
S1D18 Simply Shaker
S1D19 Effortless Entertaining
S1D20 Five Ingredients or Less
S1D21 Slimmed Down Classics
S1D22 Girls at the Grill
S1D23 Pot Luck Contest
S1D24 Founder's Feast
S1D25 Wedding Rehearsal Dinner
S1D26 Cakeman Raven
S1D27 Shortcut Supper
S1D28 Country Brunch
SS1D29 DIY Dinners
SS1D30 Al Fresco Favorites
SS1D31 Nuevo Latino
SS1D32 New World Cuisine
SS1D33 Effortless Entertaining: Cocktail Party
SS1D34 Singapore Sensations
SS1D35 All Hallows Bash
SS1D36 All Star Entertaining
SS1D37 Midnight Buffet
SS1D38 Supper in Seconds
SS1D39 Slimmed Down Classics
SS1D40 All About Russet Potatoes
SS1D41 New England Classics
SS1D42 Eye on Pie
SS1D43 Meatless Meals
SS1D44 Five Ingredients or Less
SS1D45 Five Ingredients or Less
SS1D46 Low Country Cooking
SS1D47 Harvest Dinner: Thanksgiving
SS1D48 American Wine and Cheese Party
SS1D49 Country Classics
SS1D50 Chefs Cook at Home
SS1D51 Festival of Lights: Hannukah
SS1D52 Holiday Breads
SS1D53 Budget Gourmet: Chicken
SS1D54 Quick Pickling
SS1D55 Turkey Day Transformations
SS1D56 Shortcut Suppers
SS1D57 All About Vanilla
SS1D58 Guilt-free Gourmet
SS1D59 All About Maple Syrup
SS1D60 A Menu of Memories
SS1D61 Retro Desserts
SS1D62 Holiday Cookies
SS1D63 Moroccan Dinner
SS1D64 Spectacular Serving
SS1D65 Favorite Thanksgiving Sides
SS1D66 Family Favorites
SS1D67 Fisherman's Catch
SS1D68 Cooking for One
SS1D69 Nuts for Peanuts
SS1D70 Slimmed Down Classics
SS1D71 Memorable Meals
SS1D72 Spice It Up!
SS1D73 Tastes of Greece
SS1D74 Bread Basics
SS1D75 Late Night Sandwiches
SS1D76 Everyday Jamaican
SS1D77 Short-Order Secrets
SS1D78 Meatless Meals
SS1D79 Soup for Supper
SS1D80 Gaelic Grub
SS1D81 Budget Gourmet:Grind It Up!
SS1D82 Dinner in a Dash
SS1D83 Spectacular Serving
SS1D84 You Asked For It!
SS1D85 Cook Today, Serve Tomorrow
SS1D86 Romantic Rendezvous
SS1D87 Effortless Entertaining: Super Bowl Party
SS1D88 California Cookin'
SS1D89 Caribbean Cookin'
SS1D90 Tricks of the Trade
SS1D91 Melting Pot
SS1D92 Amazing Grains
SS1D93 Pasta Pronto

Season 4
SS1E01 Stylish Sandwiches
SS1E02 Effortless Entertaining
SS1E03 Chef Cooks at Home
SS1E04 Mother's Day Brunch
SS1E05 Fresh and Healthy
SS1E06 Five Ingredients or Less
SS1E07 Spectacular Serving
SS1E08 Cookie Class
SS1E09 American Bistro
SS1E10 Salads for Supper
SS1E11 Food To Go
SS1E12 International Pancakes
SS1E13 Russian Easter
SS1E14 Shortcut Suppers: Rotisserie Chicken
SS1E15 Bridal Buffet
SS1E16 Butcher's Basics
SS1E17 Hot and Spicy
SS1E18 Arthur Avenue
SS1E19 Coffee Cookin'
SS1E20 Frozen Treats
SS1E21 Cab Fare
SS1E22 Double Duty
SS1E23 Simple Sautes
SS1E24 The Wok
SS1E25 Budget Gourmet
SS1E26 One Dish Meals
SS1E27 Foolproof Dishes
SS1E28 Small Plates
SS1E29 Five Ingredients or Less
SS1E30 Simple Soups
SS1E31 Cooking With Kids
SS1E32 Old South BBQ
SS1E33 Chef Cooks at Home
SS1E34 Healthy Pleasures
SS1E35 Dinner and a Movie
SS1E36 Low Carb, High Flavor
SS1E37 Gone Fishin'
SS1E38 Recipe for Romance
SS1E39 Effortless Entertaining
SS1E40 Lunchtime Luxury
SS1E41 Heritage Brunch
SS1E42 Nothing's Taboo
SS1E43 Portuguese Dinner
SS1E44 American Sandwiches
SS1E45 Eating Well
SS1E46 Smokin'
SS1E47 Spectacular Serving
SS1E48 Dinner to a Tea
SS1E49 Wing It!
SS1E50 Chesapeake Dinner
SS1E51 Everyday French
SS1E52 The Cutting Edge
SS1E53 A Day at Gourmet
SS1E54 Family Favorites

Season 5
SS1301 International Chicken
SS1302 Breakfast for Dinner
SS1303 5 Ingredients or Less
SS1304 Sandwiches for Supper
SS1305 Weeknight Treats
SS1306 All About Paprika
SS1307 Cook like a Chef
SS1308 Basic Braising
SS1309 Soup Starters
SS1310 Blueberry Basics
SS1311 Totally Tomatoes
SS1312 Egg Whites 101
SS1313 Sunday Dinner
SS1314 Nigerian Dinner
SS1315 Kitchen Improv
SS1316 Cupcakes
SS1317 Gourmet Dinners
SS1318 Weekend Breakfast
SS1319 Farm to Table
SS1320 Everyday Colombian
SS1321 Everyday Chinese
SS1322 Latino Shortcuts
SS1323 Dinner and Movie
SS1324 Loafin'It
SS1325 American Icons
SS1326 All About Pork
SS1327 B.Casual

References

External links
Sara's Secrets on FoodTV.com

Food Network original programming
2002 American television series debuts
2007 American television series endings